Robert Middlemass (September 3, 1883 – September 10, 1949) was an American playwright and stage actor, and later character actor with over 100 film appearances, usually playing detectives or policemen.

Biography

Middlemass was born in New Britain, Connecticut. He graduated from Harvard University in 1909 and initially went into the insurance business, but soon went on the stage, joining the Castle Square Theatre stock company in Boston. He debuted on Broadway in September 1914 in The Bludgeon at the Maxine Elliott Theatre.

His best known play was a one-act melodrama written with Holworthy Hall (real name H.E. Porter, a college roommate) titled The Valiant, which was also made into a film of the same name in 1929, and as The Man Who Wouldn't Talk in 1940. The play became a favorite for amateur and local theater groups and is still performed today.

Middlemass moved to Los Angeles around 1935 and began appearing in films. He died there in 1949.

Select theatre credits

 Buddies (1919–20)
 For All of Us (1923–24)
 The Butter and Egg Man (1925–26)
 The Valiant (1926, one night on Broadway), first published in McClure's in 1921.
 Gambling (1929–30)
 Small Miracle (1934–35)

Selected filmography

 Other Men's Daughters (1918) - Richard Ormsby
 Five Thousand an Hour (1918) - Ashley Loring
 The Winchester Woman (1919) - Alan Woodward
 A Day At The Races (1932) - Sheriff
 Party Wire (1935) - Judge Stephenson
 Air Hawks (1935) - Martin Drewen
 The Awakening of Jim Burke (1935) - Bill Duke
 Unknown Woman (1935) - Hammacher
 The Black Room (1935) - The Prosecutor (uncredited)
 After the Dance (1935) - King
 Atlantic Adventure (1935) - Harry Van Dieman
 The Public Menace (1935) - Frentrup
 She Couldn't Take It (1935) - Desk Sergeant (uncredited)
 Grand Exit (1935) - Fire Chief Mulligan
 Crime and Punishment (1935) - Cop (uncredited)
 One Way Ticket (1935) - Bender
 Super-Speed (1935) - Wilson Gale
 Too Tough to Kill (1935) - Hubbel
 If You Could Only Cook (1935) - Chief Inspector (uncredited)
 The Lone Wolf Returns (1935) - Chief of Detectives McGowan
 Two Against the World (1936) - Bertram C. Reynolds
 Dangerous Intrigue (1936) - Koenig (uncredited)
 Muss 'em Up (1936) - Inspector Brock
 You May Be Next (1936) - Dan McMahon
 Frankie and Johnny (1936) - Minor Role (uncredited)
 F-Man (1936) - Chief Cartwright
 Nobody's Fool (1936) - Sharkey (uncredited)
 A Son Comes Home (1936) - Sheriff
 Grand Jury (1936) - Police Chief Brady (uncredited)
 The Case of the Velvet Claws (1936) - Police Sgt. Wilbur Hoffman
 Cain and Mabel (1936) - Mr. George, Cafe Proprietor
 Hideaway Girl (1936) - Capt. Dixon
 Hats Off (1936) - Tex Connolly
 General Spanky (1936) - Overseer
 Guns of the Pecos (1937) - Judge L.F. Blake
 Trapped (1937) - Sol Rothert
 A Day at the Races (1937) - Sheriff
 The Last Train from Madrid (1937) - Militiaman (uncredited)
 Meet the Boyfriend (1937) - McGrath
 Charlie Chan on Broadway (1937) - Police Official (uncredited)
 Madame X (1937) - Prefect of Police (uncredited)
 Navy Blue and Gold (1937) - Academy Superintendent
 45 Fathers (1937) - Lawyer Calhoun (uncredited)
 The Bad Man of Brimstone (1937) - Schurz - Jury Foreman (uncredited)
 Love Is a Headache (1938) - Police Commissioner (uncredited)
 Blondes at Work (1938) - Boylan - Editor
 Arsène Lupin Returns (1938) - Sergeant (uncredited)
 Men Are Such Fools (1938) - Elevator-Starter (uncredited)
 Highway Patrol (1938) - J.W. Brady
 I Am the Law (1938) - Moss Kitchell
 Spawn of the North (1938) - Davis (uncredited)
 Hold That Co-ed (1938) - Campaign Committeeman (uncredited)
 The Mad Miss Manton (1938) - District Attorney (uncredited)
 Tarnished Angel (1938) - Police Chief Thomas (uncredited)
 I Stand Accused (1938) - Norman L. Mitchell
 The Cowboy and the Lady (1938) - Newspaper Chief (uncredited)
 While New York Sleeps (1938) - James Sawyer
 Kentucky (1938) - Track Official
 Stand Up and Fight (1939) - Harkrider
 Idiot's Delight (1939) - Hospital Commandant (uncredited)
 Hotel Imperial (1939) - General Von Schwartzberg (uncredited)
 Maisie (1939) - Doctor (uncredited)
 Indianapolis Speedway (1939) - Edward Hart
 The Magnificent Fraud (1939) - Morales
 Coast Guard (1939) - Capt. Lyons
 Stanley and Livingstone (1939) - Carmichael (uncredited)
 Blackmail (1939) - Desk Sergeant (uncredited)
 Espionage Agent (1939) - Militant American Tourist (uncredited)
 The Arizona Kid (1939) - General Stark
 Mr. Smith Goes to Washington (1939) - 2nd Radio Announcer (uncredited)
 Blondie Brings Up Baby (1939) - Abner Cartwright
 The Amazing Mr. Williams (1939) - Police Commissioner (uncredited)
 Slightly Honorable (1939) - Sen. Berry
 Abe Lincoln in Illinois (1940) - Minor Role (uncredited)
 Little Old New York (1940) - Nicholas Roosevelt
 The Saint Takes Over (1940) - Captain Wade
 The Captain Is a Lady (1940) - Captain Peterson (uncredited)
 Pop Always Pays (1940) - Mr. Oberton
 Gold Rush Maisie (1940) - Charlie - Camp Owner (uncredited)
 Dulcy (1940) - The Real Schuyler Van Dyke (uncredited)
 The Great Plane Robbery (1940) - Manager (uncredited)
 The Man Who Wouldn't Talk (1940)
 Road to Zanzibar (1941) - Police inspector
 They Met in Argentina (1941) - George Hastings (uncredited)
 Lady Scarface (1941) - Police Capt. Lovell (uncredited)
 No Hands on the Clock (1941) - Police Chief Bates
 Torpedo Boat (1942) - Mr. Townsend
 Klondike Fury (1942) - Sam Armstrong
 The War Against Mrs. Hadley (1942) - Air Raid Warden (uncredited)
 Daring Young Man (1942) - Drummond
 The Payoff (1942) - Lester Norris
 Johnny Doughboy (1942) - V.J. (uncredited)
 Truck Busters (1943) - Landis
 Submarine Alert (1943) - Johnny's Father (uncredited)
 Bombardier (1943) - Officer (uncredited)
 The Black Raven (1943) - Tim Winfield
 Lady in the Death House (1944) - State's Attorney
 Gambler's Choice (1944) - Thomas J. Dennis (uncredited)
 Wilson (1944) - Lindley M. Garrison - Secretary of War (uncredited)
 An American Romance (1944) - Mr. Jarrett (uncredited)
 My Buddy (1944) - Judge (uncredited)
 Main Street After Dark (1945) - Detective (uncredited)
 A Sporting Chance (1945) - William Reardon
 Mama Loves Papa (1945) - The Mayor (uncredited)
 The Dolly Sisters (1945) - Oscar Hammerstein (uncredited)
 Hold That Blonde (1945) - Police Captain (uncredited)
 Masquerade in Mexico (1945) - Customs Official (uncredited)
 Suspense (1946) - Lead Woodsman (uncredited)
 The Trouble with Women (1947) - Pompus Regent (uncredited) (final film role)

References

External links

The Valiant, McClure's (March 1921)

1883 births
1949 deaths
American male film actors
Writers from New Britain, Connecticut
Male actors from Connecticut
20th-century American male actors
Harvard University alumni